"Exile Pride (Konna Sekai o Ai Suru Tame)" (stylized as ) is the 41st single by the Japanese dance & vocal group Exile. It was released on April 3, 2013. It debuted in number one on the weekly Oricon Singles Chart. It was the 5th best-selling single in Japan in 2013, with 1,012,407 copies sold.

Track List 
EXILE PRIDE ~Konna Sekai wo Aisuru Tame~
EXILE PRIDE ~Konna Sekai wo Aisuru Tame~ (Instrumental)

References 

2013 singles
2013 songs
Japanese-language songs
Exile (Japanese band) songs
Oricon Weekly number-one singles